Otsego Lake is located in northwest Michigan at , south of the city of Gaylord in Otsego County. The lake spans the boundary between Otsego Lake Township to the south and Bagley Township to the north.  Otsego Lake State Park is located on the southeast shore of the lake and Otsego County Park is on the northwest shore. The lake has many private cottages and homes with direct access to the lake and parks.

History 
Otsego Lake was the long-time summer residence of Arthur Compton. Compton received the Nobel Prize for physics in 1927 for his work with X-rays and what later became known as the "Compton effect". During World War II, he was a key figure in the Manhattan Project that developed the first nuclear weapons. In the late 1950s, noted American architect and Frank Lloyd Wright protege, William Adair Bernoudy, designed Compton's retirement home on the lake directly across from Otsego Lake State Park.

Dimensions 
The bottom shoal composed of sand and light gravel forms many "drop-offs" and holes. The lake is full of vegetation which is submerged at the bottom of the lake with very little floating vegetation.

Lake activities 
There are an abundance of boats that frequent the lake during the busy times of year which bring along many skiers and boarders, as well as many tubing activities. Fisherman can also be seen scattered throughout the lake as well as the occasional seaplane.

Fish
The following fish can be found in the lake and are subject to fishing:
 Muskelunge
 Lake Sturgeon
 Northern pike
 Largemouth bass
 Smallmouth bass
 Rock bass
 Bluegill
 Yellow perch
 Pumpkinseed sunfish
 Walleye

See also
 List of lakes in Michigan

References

Lakes of Michigan
Bodies of water of Otsego County, Michigan